Kenya competed at the 2016 Summer Olympics in Rio de Janeiro, Brazil, from 5 to 21 August 2016. This was the nation's fourteenth appearance at the Summer Olympics.

The National Olympic Committee of Kenya (NOCK) sent its largest ever delegation to the Games, with 89 athletes, 47 men and 42 women, competing across seven sports. Among the sports represented by the nation's athletes, Kenya marked its Olympic debut in rugby sevens (new to the 2016 Games), as well as its return to archery after 16 years and judo after 24 years. As usual, athletics had the largest team by sport with 48 athletes, roughly more than half of the nation's full roster size.

The Kenyan roster was highlighted by five past Olympic medalists, including world record holder David Rudisha in the men's 800 metres, middle-distance runner Asbel Kiprop, steeplechasers Brimin Kipruto and Ezekiel Kemboi, and four-time Olympian Vivian Cheruiyot, who previously won two medals in long-distance running at London 2012. Other notable Kenyan athletes featured Africa's top javelin thrower and 2015 world champion Julius Yego, and archer Shehzana Anwar, who was eventually chosen as the nation's flag bearer in the opening ceremony.

Due to Kenya's national anti-doping organisation having been declared non-compliant with the World Anti-Doping Code, the International Olympic Committee decided on 21 June 2016 that the eligibility of Kenyan athletes should be decided on an individual basis by the International Federation, governing each sport.

Despite the controversies, Kenya left Rio de Janeiro with 13 medals (6 golds, 6 silver, and 1 bronze), marking its most successful outcome in Olympic history based on the medal position. All of these medals were awarded to the track and field athletes, with Rudisha successfully retaining his men's 800 m title. For the first time in history, Kenya obtained medals in the field events and hurdles through Yego and Boniface Mucheru, respectively, as well as the women's marathon title from Jemima Sumgong. Tantalizing results in women's distance running saw Cheruiyot and Faith Kipyegon  upstage the race favorites from Ethiopia to take the gold medals. Meanwhile, Conseslus Kipruto surpassed the defending champion Kemboi to earn Kenya's eleventh overall title in the men's 3000 m steeplechase. Kemboi, who initially won bronze to become the first steeplechaser with three Olympic medals, was eventually disqualified for stepping off the track at the water jump phase.

Medalists

Archery
 
One Kenyan archer qualified for the women's individual recurve by obtaining one of the three Olympic places available from the 2016 African Archery Championships in Windhoek, Namibia, anticipating the nation's Olympic return to the sport for the first time since 2000.

Athletics (track and field)
 
Kenyan athletes have so far achieved qualifying standards in the following athletics events (up to a maximum of 3 athletes in each event):

Six marathon runners (three per gender) were named to the Kenyan team on May 10, 2016, with 42 more athletes (29 men and 13 women) joining them and being added to the roster on July 2, 2016, based on their performances achieved throughout the qualifying period. Among them were reigning Olympic men's 800 metres champion David Rudisha, two-time steeplechase gold medalist Ezekiel Kemboi, 2015 Worlds champions Julius Yego (javelin throw) and Nicholas Bett (400 m hurdles), and double Olympic medalist Vivian Cheruiyot in long-distance running.

Track & road events
Men

Women

Field events

Boxing

Kenya has entered three boxers to compete in each of the following weight classes into the Olympic boxing tournament. Rayton Okwiri had claimed his Olympic spot with a semifinal victory at the 2016 African Qualification Tournament in Yaoundé, Cameroon. Meanwhile, light flyweight boxer Peter Mungai Warui had received a spare Olympic berth as the next highest-ranked boxer, not yet qualified, in the same meet, due to South Africa's decision not to accept spots through the continental qualifier.

Bantamweight boxer and London 2012 Olympian Benson Gicharu rounded out the Kenyan roster with his semifinal triumph at the 2016 APB and WSB Olympic Qualifier in Vargas, Venezuela.

Judo

Kenya has qualified one judoka for the men's middleweight category (90 kg) at the Games, signifying the nation's Olympic comeback to the sport for the first time since 1992. Kiplangat Sang earned a continental quota spot from the African region, as the highest-ranked Kenyan judoka outside of direct qualifying position in the IJF World Ranking List of May 30, 2016.

Rugby sevens

Men's tournament

Kenyan men's rugby sevens team qualified for the Olympics by winning the 2015 Africa Cup Sevens in Johannesburg, South Africa.

Team roster

Group play

Classification semifinal (9–12)

Eleventh place match

Women's tournament

Kenyan women's rugby sevens team qualified for the Olympics by attaining a runner-up finish at the 2015 Women's Africa Cup Sevens in Johannesburg, as the qualifying winners South Africa decided not to accept their Olympic berth.

Team roster

Group play

Classification semifinal (9–12)

Eleventh place match

Swimming

Kenya has received a Universality invitation from FINA to send two swimmers (one male and one female) to the Olympics.

Weightlifting

Kenya has received an unused quota place from IWF to send a male weightlifter to the Olympics.

See also
Kenya at the 2016 Summer Paralympics

References

External links

 
 

Nations at the 2016 Summer Olympics
2016
Olympics